Gino Ronald van Kessel (born 9 March 1993) is a Curaçaoan professional footballer who plays for the Curaçao national team as a forward.

Club career

Youth career
Van Kessel joined the youth ranks of AZ Alkmaar in 2008. In 2012, he finished as top scorer of the 2012 Copa Amsterdam with 5 goals.

In the same year, Van Kessel joined Ajax. In 2013, he again became top scorer of the Copa Amsterdam, netting three goals for the Amsterdam side.

Ajax
Initially, Van Kessel was part of Ajax's reserve squad.

For the 2013–14 season he returned to Ajax. Following his second appearance in the Copa Amsterdam in which he again finished as top scorer of the tournament, Van Kessel was given the number 34 shirt and participated in the Ajax pre-season training camp. He also appeared in a friendly fixture against SDC Putten, coming on in the second half for Tobias Sana in the 1–4 away victory.

Almere City (loan)
In December 2012, Van Kessel was loaned to neighboring Almere City FC, where he played in the Dutch Jupiler League for the remainder of the 2012–2013 season. In Almere he was rejoined with his fellow Ajax teammates Sven Nieuwpoort and Henri Toivomaki, all playing for Almere City on loan from Ajax. During his loan period, he appeared in ten league matches, scoring once.

AS Trenčín (loan)
On 14 July 2013, it was announced that Van Kessel would serve a six-month loan spell in Slovakia, playing for FK AS Trenčín in the Slovak Super Liga until the winter transfer window in January. At Trenčín, a club owned by former Ajax player Tschen La Ling, he was given the number 9 shirt.

He was on the bench in Sweden for his new club's UEFA Europa League qualifying match against IFK Göteborg on 18 July 2013 but did not make an appearance in the 0–0 draw. Instead he made his debut for Trenčín in a regular season 2–1 away loss against Spartak Trnava. Van Kessel started in the striker position, and was substituted off in the 61st minute, after having been cautioned in the 56th minute. He made his continental debut on 8 August 2013, in a UEFA Europa League qualifying match against Astra Giurgiu, having been brought in for Karol Mondek in the 61st minute, and scoring in the 88th minute. The match ended in a 2–2 resulting in a 3–5 aggregate loss for AS Trenčín, and elimination in the third qualifying round. A few days later, on 11 August 2013, Van Kessel scored his first league goal in an encounter with DAC which ended in a 6–0 victory for Trenčín. On 1 December 2013, Van Kessel returned to Amsterdam with AS Trenčín sitting in second place in their league table at the time of his return, making a total of 16 league appearances, scoring 8 goals, and six assists during league play, having also scored once in the Europa League while playing for the Slovakian side.

On 18 January 2014, his loan was extended until 1 July 2014 for an additional six months completing the season with the Slovakian side.

Arles-Avignon
On 25 August 2014, it was announced that Van Kessel had joined the French Ligue 2 side from Avignon, signing a two-year contract with the club. He made his debut for Arles-Avignon in an away match against Nîmes Olympique on 29 August 2014 which ended in a 2–2 draw. On 12 September 2014, he scored his first goal for Arles-Avignon in a 1–0 victory at home against Tours FC.

Return to Trenčín
On 1 January 2015, Van Kessel returned to Trenčín, the club where he had previously won both "MVP" and "Fans Favorite" club awards during his loan spell from Ajax. He made his first appearance of the season on 28 February 2015 in a 2–0 home win against Dukla Banská Bystrica.

Slavia Prague
In July 2016, Van Kessel joined the Czech side Slavia Prague becoming one of the most expensive players ever bought by a Czech team with a transfer fee equivalent to €1.2 million. On 21 July 2016, he played his first game with Slavia, scoring a goal and an assist against Levadia Tallinn in a second qualifying round match of the UEFA Europa League.

Lechia Gdańsk (loan)
On the final day of the 2016–17 winter transfer window, it was announced that Van Kessel would serve out the remainder of the season on a six-month loan spell with Polish club Lechia Gdańsk competing in the Ekstraklasa, the top flight of football in Poland. During his half-season in Poland, he only appeared in three league matches, playing for a combined total of 166 minutes.

Oxford United (loan)
In August 2017, Van Kessel joined English side Oxford United on loan from Slavia Prague. He scored a fantastic individual goal just 3 minutes after replacing Marvin Johnson to mark a fairytale debut appearance for the Yellows in a 3–0 home victory over Portsmouth in League One.

Roeselare
On 9 August 2018, van Kessel signed for Belgian second division side K.S.V. Roeselare on a one-year contract.

Spartak Trnava
On 19 July 2019 he returned to Slovakia signing with first-tier side FC Spartak Trnava. He made one appearance in a friendly match against Bulgarian side Lokomotiv Plovdiv on 25 July 2019.

AS Trenčín (loan)
He was subsequently loaned out on a 6-month loan spell to his former club AS Trenčín.

Third spell at Trenčín
On the final transfer day of the winter transfer window for the 2019–20 Slovak First Football League, Van Kessel was transferred to his former club following a successful six-month loan spell. He played a total of 26 matches for Trenčín that season, scoring six goals.

Olympiakos Nicosia
In July 2020, Van Kessel left for two seasons to Olympiakos Nicosia. In March 2021, his contract was terminated in connection with the COVID-19 pandemic in Cyprus, returning to the Netherlands in search of a new club.

Dalkurd FF
On 16 August 2021 it was announced that Van Kessel had signed with Swedish club Dalkurd FF, competing in the Ettan Fotboll Division 1, the third tier of professional football in Sweden.

Gyirmót
On 20 January 2022, after having made zero appearances for Dalkurd, Van Kessel moved to Hungarian NB I side Gyirmót FC Győr on a free transfer.

International career

Curaçao national team
On 24 May 2015, it was announced that Van Kessel had received his first International call-up by head coach Patrick Kluivert to represent Curaçao in the 2018 FIFA World Cup qualifying match against Cuba on 7 June 2015. He made his first appearance in a 0–0 draw at home on 10 June 2015, coming on as a 69-minute substitute. He made his debut on 10 June 2015 in the home leg against Cuba which ended in a 0–0 draw, coming on as a 69th-minute substitute for Quenten Martinus. Curaçao were able to defeat Cuba based on the away goal rule following a 1–1 draw in Havana, thus qualifying for the Third Round of CONCACAF qualification.

Curaçao were eliminated from qualifications in the third round by El Salvador, losing both matches 1–0 with Van Kessel playing the full 90 minutes in both matches, failing to qualify for the 2018 FIFA World Cup in Russia. On 26 March 2016, Van Kessel scored his first goal for the national team in his sixth match for Curaçao in a 2017 Caribbean Cup qualification match against the Dominican Republic. Curaçao advanced to the second round, with a 2–1 win. In the following round, the team defeated Guyana (5–2) and the U.S. Virgin Islands (7–0) advancing to the third round. Van Kessel scored twice against Guyana, while scoring a hattrick against the U.S. Virgin Islands.

On 11 October 2016, Curaçao finished the third qualifying round ahead of the 2017 Caribbean Cup atop of their group, finishing ahead of Antigua and Barbuda and Puerto Rico, thus qualifying for the final tournament, as well as the 2017 CONCACAF Gold Cup. It was the country's first berth to the finals of the Continental tournament since the dissolution of the Netherlands Antilles, and their first time to the tournament since 1969.

Having appeared in all qualifying matches, Van Kessel finished as joint top scorer of the qualification rounds of the tournament, together with his teammate Felitciano Zschusschen, with 7 goals each. As a result, he was subsequently nominated for the 2016 CONCACAF Best XI selection, losing to contenders André-Pierre Gignac and Bryan Ruiz in the process.

Career statistics

Club

1 Includes UEFA Champions League and UEFA Europa League matches.

2 Includes Johan Cruijff Shield, Slovak Super Cup and Coupe de la Ligue matches.

International

International goals
 Curaçao score listed first, score column indicates score after each van Kessel goal.''

Honours
AS Trenčín
 Fortuna Liga: 2014–15, 2015-16
 Slovak Cup: 2014–15, 2015-16

Slavia Prague
 First League: 2016–17

Curaçao
 Caribbean Cup: 2017
 King's Cup: 2019

Individual
 Copa Amsterdam Top Scorer: 2012, 2013
 FK AS Trenčín Most Valuable Player: 2013–14
 FK AS Trenčín Fans Favorite Player of the Year: 2013–14
 Slovak First Football League Top Scorer 2015-16
 Nominated for CONCACAF Male Best XI 2016 Selection
 EFL League One Goal of the Month: August 2017
 2017 Caribbean Cup qualification Top Scorer (shared with Felitciano Zschusschen)
 2017 Caribbean Cup Golden Boot winner.

References

External links
 Voetbal International profile 
 
 Gino van Kessel Interview

1993 births
Living people
Dutch footballers
Curaçao footballers
Curaçao international footballers
Curaçao expatriate footballers
Association football forwards
Sportspeople from Alkmaar
Dutch people of Curaçao descent
AFC Ajax players
Almere City FC players
AS Trenčín players
AC Arlésien players
SK Slavia Prague players
Lechia Gdańsk players
Oxford United F.C. players
K.S.V. Roeselare players
FC Spartak Trnava players
Olympiakos Nicosia players
Dalkurd FF players
Gyirmót FC Győr players
Czech First League players
Eerste Divisie players
Ligue 2 players
Slovak Super Liga players
Ekstraklasa players
English Football League players
Challenger Pro League players
Cypriot First Division players
Ettan Fotboll players
Nemzeti Bajnokság I players
Expatriate footballers in Slovakia
Expatriate footballers in France
Expatriate footballers in the Czech Republic
Expatriate footballers in Poland
Expatriate footballers in England
Expatriate footballers in Belgium
Expatriate footballers in Cyprus
Expatriate footballers in Sweden
Expatriate footballers in Hungary
Curaçao expatriate sportspeople in Slovakia
Curaçao expatriate sportspeople in France
Curaçao expatriate sportspeople in the Czech Republic
Curaçao expatriate sportspeople in Poland
Curaçao expatriate sportspeople in England
Curaçao expatriate sportspeople in Belgium
Curaçao expatriate sportspeople in Cyprus
2017 CONCACAF Gold Cup players
2019 CONCACAF Gold Cup players
Footballers from North Holland